John Millman was the defending champion but chose not to defend his title.

Chung Hyeon won the title after defeating James Duckworth 6–4, 7–6(7–2) in the final.

Seeds

Draw

Finals

Top half

Bottom half

References
 Main Draw
 Qualifying Draw

Kobe Challenger - Singles
2016 Singles